Walt Cobb (born 1944) is a Canadian politician, who served as a BC Liberal Member of the Legislative Assembly of British Columbia from 2001 to 2005, representing the riding of Cariboo South.

Cobb was a business owner and municipal politician prior to his election to the legislature. He was returned as mayor in the 2014 BC Municipal election. He has served the City of Williams Lake for ten years as a councillor (1980-1990) and three terms as mayor (1990-1996, 2014–present).

In November 2021, calls for Cobb's resignation began after he suggested in a private Facebook post that there might be two sides to genocide.

References

External links
Walt Cobb
Walt Cobb, Mayor of Williams Lake

British Columbia Liberal Party MLAs
1944 births
Living people
Mayors of places in British Columbia
21st-century Canadian politicians